François Victor Le Tonnelier de Breteuil (17 April 1686 – 7 January 1743 in Issy) was a French nobleman. He was minister for war twice under Louis XV. He was also chancelier, garde des sceaux de la Maison de la reine and commander, provost and grandmaster of ceremonies to the Order of the Holy Spirit (1721–1743).

He was a member of the Le Tonnelier de Breteuil family. He was the marquis of Fontenay-Trésigny, sire de Villebert, seigneur de Breteuil, du Mesnil-Chassemartin, des Chapelles, de Villenevotte et de Palaiseau, baron de Boitron et de Preuilly.

References

1686 births
1743 deaths
Secretaries of State for War (France)
18th-century French people
17th-century French people
People of the Regency of Philippe d'Orléans
People of the Ancien Régime